Vladimir Aleksandrovich Kuleshov (born 18 May 1986) is a former Russian footballer.

Club career
He played 4 seasons in the Russian Football National League for 4 different clubs.

External links
 
 

1986 births
Sportspeople from Bishkek
Living people
Russian footballers
Association football midfielders
FC Shinnik Yaroslavl players
FC Lukhovitsy players
Dinaburg FC players
FC Orenburg players
FC Khimki players
FC Tyumen players
FC Rubin Yalta players
FC Baikal Irkutsk players
Latvian Higher League players
Crimean Premier League players
Russian expatriate footballers
Expatriate footballers in Latvia
Russian expatriate sportspeople in Latvia